Chandan Dass (born 12 March 1956) is a popular Indian ghazal singer.

Early life and training

Chandan Dass began singing ghazals from the age of eight, when he started training under the tutelage of Ustad Moosa Khan. He was also trained in classical music under Pandit Mani Prasad of Delhi, a great stalwart and purist of the highest realm.

Career

His first album was released in 1982, when Talat Aziz discovered and introduced him to Music India Ltd. His maiden album was an instant hit and inspired him to make many more albums. He released a number of albums and cassettes. He has composed music for all his albums and has sung for many popular TV serials and films.

He also used to perform on Doordarshan, India's national Television Network, in the serial Sugam Sangeet. in 1980s along with Penaz Masani, Raj Kumar Rizvi, Rajendra Mehta and Neena Mehta.

His achievements in the field of music can be seen from the various awards he has got throughout his career. His album "Deewangi (Hindi: दीवानगी) Erotomania" was a trendsetter. Apart from being one of the most popular ghazal singers in recent times, Dass has also been composing music for mainstream Bollywood movies.

Personal life

Chandan Dass considers Mehdi Hassan the father of ghazals and likes to encourage aspirants to keep the trend of ghazals as a music genre alive in India. His aim has always been to give the audiences good music and to reach out to people and touch their hearts. Chandan's compositions and ghazals are of a high order and the rendering is well balanced, flawless and of clear diction.

Chandan Dass is married to Yamini Dass and has one son, Namit Das, who is an actor and singer. His brother-in-law Jaidev Kumar is a famous Punjabi music director.

Tours and performances

Chandan Dass has given innumerable live performances, not only all over India but also abroad. His shows have been highly appreciated, applauded and raved about by the audiences who have heard him. He has created a niche in the hearts of the masses and stands like a pillar amongst the doyen of ghazal singers in the present era.

 He has also toured the world with his renditions of ghazals and also performed at a live concert in the Netherlands to rave reviews. 
 Chandan Dass regaled the audience in a live concert in Lucknow town of Uttar Pradesh, India on 28 November 2005 with his scintillating rendition.
 Recently, he was Chief Guest at the five-day inter-faculty youth festival and cultural fest Spandan 2013 of Banaras Hindu University held in February–March 2013.

Discography

Awards

Chandan's efforts have been rewarded through many awards coming his way from the first Best New Ghazal Singer of 1983 to the two prestigious SUMU awards under the categories of Best Ghazal and The Best Ghazal Singer of 1993 for his album Deewangi.

References

1956 births
Living people
Indian male ghazal singers
People from Delhi